The 2013 Eurocup Mégane Trophy season was the ninth  and final season of the Renault–supported touring car category, a one-make racing series that is part of the World Series by Renault.

Driver lineup

Race calendar and results
The calendar for the 2013 season was announced on 20 October 2012, the day before the end of the 2012 season. All seven rounds will form meetings of the 2013 World Series by Renault season.

Championship standings
 Points for both championships were awarded as follows:

Drivers' Championship

Footnotes

References

External links
 Renault-Sport official website

Eurocup Megane Trophy
Eurocup Megane Trophy
Eurocup Mégane Trophy seasons